Thameside could refer to:

Network Rail route name for the London, Tilbury and Southend line
Thameside (bus company)
Thameside (HM Prison)
Thameside Radio
Thameside Series of canoe and kayak races

See also
Tameside, a borough of Greater Manchester